9905 Tiziano, provisional designation , is an asteroid from the inner regions of the asteroid belt, approximately 5 kilometers in diameter. Discovered during the Palomar–Leiden survey in 1960, the asteroid was named after Italian Renaissance painter Titian.

Discovery 

Tiziano was discovered on 24 September 1960, by Dutch astronomer couple Ingrid and Cornelis van Houten, as well as Dutch–American astronomer Tom Gehrels. The asteroid was spotted during the Palomar–Leiden survey by examining photographic plates taken at Palomar Observatory, California, United States.

The survey designation "P-L" stands for Palomar–Leiden, named after Palomar Observatory and Leiden Observatory, which collaborated on the fruitful Palomar–Leiden survey in the 1960s. Gehrels used Palomar's Samuel Oschin telescope (also known as the 48-inch Schmidt Telescope), and shipped the photographic plates to Ingrid and Cornelis van Houten at Leiden Observatory where astrometry was carried out. The trio are credited with the discovery of several thousand minor planets.

Orbit and classification 

Tiziano orbits the Sun in the inner main-belt at a distance of 2.1–2.7 AU once every 3 years and 9 months (1,361 days). Its orbit has an eccentricity of 0.13 and an inclination of 13° with respect to the ecliptic. The body's observation arc begins with its official discovery observation at Palomar, as no precoveries were taken, and no prior identifications were made.

Physical characteristics

Diameter and albedo 

According to the survey carried out by NASA's Wide-field Infrared Survey Explorer with its subsequent NEOWISE mission, Tiziano measures 5.239 kilometers in diameter and its surface has an albedo of 0.099. It has an absolute magnitude of 14.4

Rotation period 

As of 2017, the asteroid's rotation period, shape and spectral type remain unknown.

Naming 

This minor planet was named after Tiziano Vecellio (c. 1488–1576) known in English as Titian, who was an Italian Renaissance painter and the most important member of the Venetian school. His application and use of color, would exercise a profound influence not only on painters of the Italian Renaissance, but on future generations of Western art. Titian is famous for the Equestrian Portrait of Charles V and for the Portrait of Pope Paul III. The official naming citation was published by the Minor Planet Center on 2 April 1999.

References

External links 
 Asteroid Lightcurve Database (LCDB), query form (info )
 Dictionary of Minor Planet Names, Google books
 Asteroids and comets rotation curves, CdR – Observatoire de Genève, Raoul Behrend
 Discovery Circumstances: Numbered Minor Planets (5001)-(10000) – Minor Planet Center
 
 

009905
4611
Discoveries by Cornelis Johannes van Houten
Discoveries by Ingrid van Houten-Groeneveld
Discoveries by Tom Gehrels
Named minor planets
19600924